Saturday Market may refer to:

Eugene Saturday Market, a weekly art and craft market in Eugene, Oregon
Portland Saturday Market, a weekly art and craft market in Portland, Oregon
Saturday Market at the Yupiit Piciryarait Cultural Center, Bethel, Alaska
The U.S. title of a collection of poems by Charlotte Mew, published originally in England as The Farmer's Bride